Adre-Anna Anita Jackson, also spelled Adreanna or Adre'Anna was a missing person of Native American descent from Lakewood, Washington. She disappeared at age 10 while walking to school in December 2005 in "a high-crime area with a large number of registered sex offenders". Her mother had sent her out on a three-block walk not knowing school had been canceled because of snow and didn't report her missing until late in the day.

Search, death investigation and suspects
In April 2006, her skeletonized body was found by children in a thicket near 7500 block of 146th Street Southwest in Tillicum in an abandoned lot that was "a popular passageway for school-aged children and a hangout for transients and drug users", identified as Jackson by use of her dental records. The finding followed a highly publicized search by bloodhounds and 120 personnel from the Lakewood police and fire departments, search-and-rescue teams from Pierce County and nearby Joint Base Lewis-McChord, and sonar scans of American Lake off Silcox Island organized by the Federal Bureau of Investigation (FBI). Investigators determined the death was suspicious but had not determined the exact cause of death as of 2017.

Child murderer Terapon Adhahn was a person of interest in the case and his former home was searched for evidence in 2007.

Her death appeared on the FBI's most wanted list from 2005 through 2019. As of 2020, there is a $60,000 cash reward – contributed by the FBI, local authorities, and individuals – for information leading to her killer or killers. The case remains unsolved as of 2020.

See also
Missing and murdered Indigenous women
List of solved missing person cases
List of unsolved murders

References

Further reading

Unsolved homicides: Adreanna Jackson at City of Lakewood, case #053360891 (accessed June 16, 2020)
Unsolved for 12 years, search for Adre'anna Jackson's killer continues video at Miami Herald (April 3, 2018)

 

1995 births
2000s deaths
2000s missing person cases
American people of Native American descent
Crimes in Washington (state)
December 2005 events in the United States
Female murder victims
Formerly missing people
Missing person cases in Washington (state)
People from Lakewood, Washington
Unsolved murders in the United States
2005 in Washington (state)
2006 in Washington (state)
History of Pierce County, Washington
Native Americans in Washington (state)